Tebay River (Alaska Native languages name meaning "a variety of sheep") is a waterway in the U.S. state of Alaska.

Geography
Rising in the Chugach Mountains, Tebay is one of the main affluents of the Chitina River. There are several lakes in the headwaters.

Tebay River drains the Tebay Lakes, but receives most of its water from Hanagita Creek, a much smaller part coming from Bridge Creek, the outlet to Summit Lake. Hanagita Creek is the largest stream in the Hanagita Valley; it drains a number of small lakes and receives water from numerous tributaries. Sangaina Creek is the largest of these tributaries, with a swift current and a great number of boulders in its channel.

See also
 List of rivers of Alaska

References
 
 

Rivers of Alaska
Rivers of Copper River Census Area, Alaska
Rivers of Unorganized Borough, Alaska